Grunnet may refer to:

Places 
 Grunnet, Gotland, an island in Slite archipelago, Sweden

People 
 Iver Grunnet, Danish handball player
 Sarah Grunnet Stougaard, a Danish handball player